The 2021 season was the New Orleans Saints' 55th season in the National Football League, the 46th playing home games at Caesars Superdome and the 15th and final season under head coach Sean Payton. After starting the season 5–2, the Saints fell into a five game losing streak after losing starting quarterback Jameis Winston to a torn ACL in Week 8 vs. Winston's former team, the Tampa Bay Buccaneers. They also failed to improve on their 12–4 record from last year, as well as failing to win the division title for the first time since 2016. Despite winning four of their last five games, the Saints missed the playoffs for the first time since 2016 after the San Francisco 49ers defeated the Los Angeles Rams in Week 18. The Saints finished tied with the Philadelphia Eagles for the 7th seed in the NFC, but lost the tiebreaker based on the teams' Week 11 head-to-head meeting—won by the Eagles. The team started a record of 58 different players (due to injuries and COVID-19) and ranked in the bottom 5 in total offense.

This was the first season since 2005 without long-time quarterback Drew Brees on the roster.  He announced his retirement on March 14, after playing 20 years in the league. A 13-time Pro Bowler, Brees broke several records during his tenure in New Orleans, led the franchise to its first and only Super Bowl win in Super Bowl XLIV and also retired as the league's all-time leader in passing yards, a record that would be broken by quarterback Tom Brady in Week 4 of the 2021 season against his former team, the New England Patriots. Brees was also the last remaining active player from the 2001 Draft class.

Despite having 3 years left in his contract, this was also long-time head coach Sean Payton's final season with the Saints, as he announced his departure from the team on January 25, 2022, after 16 years of coaching the team. In his tenure, Payton led the Saints to 9 playoff appearances and to the franchise's first and only Super Bowl title in Super Bowl XLIV.

Roster changes

Free agency

Unrestricted

Restricted

Futures

Signings

Practice Squad additions

Released/Waived

Practice Squad releases

Contract extensions

Retirements

Player trades

Draft

Notes
The Saints traded their third-round selection, along with a 2020 third-round selection, to the Cleveland Browns in exchange for the Browns' 2020 third- and seventh-round selections.
 The Saints traded a conditional fifth-round selection and linebacker Kiko Alonso to the San Francisco 49ers in exchange for linebacker Kwon Alexander.
 The Saints received third-round selections in 2021 and 2022 as compensation when its director of pro scouting Terry Fontenot was hired by the Atlanta Falcons as general manager.
The Saints traded their sixth-round selection to the Houston Texans for the Texan's 2020 seventh-round selection.
The Saints originally forfeited their seventh-round selection as the punishment for repeated COVID-19 protocol violations during the 2020 season, but the punishment was amended to a $700,000 fine and forfeiture of their 2022 sixth-round selection.
The Saints received a seventh-round selection from the Jacksonville Jaguars in exchange for defensive tackle Malcom Brown.
The Saints received a third-round selection (pick 76) from the Denver Broncos in exchange for a two third-round selections (picks 98 & 105).
The Saints received a sixth-round selection (pick 206) from the Indianapolis Colts in exchange for a sixth-round selection (pick 218) and a seventh-round selection (pick 229).

Undrafted Free Agent Signings

Staff

Final roster

Preseason

Regular season

Schedule
The Saints' 2021 schedule was announced on May 12.

Note: Intra-division opponents are in bold text.

Game summaries

Week 1: vs. Green Bay Packers
Despite being in Jacksonville due to the impacts of Hurricane Ida, the Saints still started their regular season 1–0 with the victory against Green Bay. Jameis Winston notched his first win as a Saints quarterback and set an odd record for least yards thrown (148) in a 5 passing TD game since 1948. This was also the Saints first victory over the Packers since the 2017 Season.

Week 2: at Carolina Panthers
With Sam Darnold as the Panthers starting quarterback, the Saints struggled with turnovers and scoring. With the loss, their record fell to 1–1. This was the Saints first loss against the Panthers since the 2018 season.

Week 3: at New England Patriots
For the first time since the 2009 season, the Saints beat the Patriots. This also marked the Saints' first road game victory against New England.  This victory improved their record to 2–1.

Week 4: vs. New York Giants
The Saints returned to the Superdome shortly after repairs from the hurricane and fire from a pressure washer mishap, but ultimately lost to the Giants in overtime due to Aldrick Rosas missing field goals. Suffering their first loss to the Giants since 2016, it also dropped their record to 2–2 and prompted the team to cut Rosas for a replacement kicker.

Week 5: at Washington Football Team
The Saints match up with Washington for the first time since the 2018 season, but face quarterback Taylor Heinicke due to Ryan Fitzpatrick's injury in Week 1. The Saints also brought in Cody Parkey, who missed a few field goals or PAT's. With the win, they improve to 3–2.

Week 7: at Seattle Seahawks
For the first time since the 2013 season, the Saints play the Seahawks on a Monday Night game. It's also their 3-point victory. They also replaced Cody Parkey with rookie kicker, Brian Johnson. They also bump their record to 4–2.

Week 8: vs. Tampa Bay Buccaneers
They meet Tom Brady again for the first time since the Divisional Round. Jameis Winston was hurt after a horse-collar tackle slammed him to the ground, prompting Trevor Siemian to start for the rest of the game and beyond. The Buccaneers were stunned after P.J. Williams scored a pick six. With the victory, they improve to 5–2.

Week 9: vs. Atlanta Falcons
The Saints were defeated by the Falcons for the first time since the 2019 season. It was also the first struggle of the season to gain victories. They drop to 5–3.

Week 10: at Tennessee Titans
The Saints lose to the Titans for the first time six seasons ago. Their kicker, Brian Johnson also struggled to kick PAT's. Their record drops to 5–4.

Week 11: at Philadelphia Eagles
It was one year ago that the Saints were beaten by the Eagles. Although the Saints got kicker Brett Maher from the Cowboys, it was determined that the Eagles had a much bigger surprise for them. They brought in their new coach. The Saints still lost and downgraded their record to 5–5.

Week 12: vs. Buffalo Bills
Thanksgiving Day games
The Saints host the Bills in the Superdome. This was also Drew Brees' return to New Orleans as a broadcast partner for NBC. The Saints unfortunately gave up to the Bills and went down to 5–6. This was also their first loss to Buffalo since the 1998 season.

Week 13: vs. Dallas Cowboys
After Trevor Siemian struggled to win those games, Taysom Hill was placed as a starter. They would lose to the Cowboys for the first time since the 2018 season, which brought their record down to 5–7.

Week 14: at New York Jets
The Saints break the five-game loss streak with the victory against the Jets. They improve to 6–7.

Week 15: at Tampa Bay Buccaneers
Despite the Buccaneers being the defending Super Bowl champions from last season, the Saints still swept them. With a rare shutout victory, they improve to 7–7.

Week 16: vs. Miami Dolphins

For the first time since the 2005 season, the Saints lost to the Dolphins. This was due, in part, to at least 20 players being on the COVID-19 reserve list. This dropped them to 7–8.

Week 17: vs. Carolina Panthers
Meeting the Panthers again from a 26-7 loss in Week 2, the Saints defeat the Panthers under Taysom Hill. They improve to 8–8.

Week 18: at Atlanta Falcons

Previously, the Saints lost to the Falcons by two points in Week 9. Despite winning the game, the team was eliminated from the playoffs when the 49ers defeated the Rams, claiming the final playoff spot. They finish with a 9–8 record and maintained a winning season, despite not making the playoffs. Taysom Hill also got hurt, prompting Trevor Siemian to start for the remainder of the game. Paulson Adebo stuns the Falcons with a one-handed interception.

Standings

Division

Conference

Notes

References

External links
 

New Orleans
New Orleans Saints seasons
New Orleans Saints